Vohitsaoka is a rural commune in the  Central Highlands of Madagascar. It belongs to the district of Ambalavao, which is a part of Haute Matsiatra Region. The population of the commune was estimated to be approximately 10,000 in 2001 commune census.

Only primary schooling is available. The majority 85% of the population of the commune are farmers, while an additional 10% receives their livelihood from raising livestock. The most important crop is rice, while other important products are maize, cassava and bambara groundnut. Services provide employment for 5% of the population.

Protected Area 
The eastern part of the commune is included in the Andringitra National Park.

References

Populated places in Haute Matsiatra